VAG or vag may refer to:

 Freiburger Verkehrs AG, the municipal transport company of the city of Freiburg, Germany
IBM VisualAge Generator, a platform-independent programming code generator
 The Vancouver Art Gallery in Vancouver, British Columbia, Canada
 A slang term for vagina, pronounced "vadge"
 Vag, a dramatic and humorous skit, part of Tamasha musical theatre of Maharashtra
 Versova-Andher-Ghatkopar, a line on the Mumbai Metro in India
 Vereinigte Astronomische Gesellschaft, United Astronomical Society
 Volkswagen Aktiengesellschaft, the German name for the automaker Volkswagen Group
 VAG Rounded, a text font designed for Volkswagen Group in 1979
 Våg, an old Scandinavian unit of mass

 Verkehrs-Aktiengesellschaft Nürnberg (VAG or VAGN), the municipal transport company of the city of Nuremberg, Germany

See also
 Vaj (disambiguation)